XHDF-TDT, virtual channel 1 (UHF digital channel 25), is the flagship station of the Azteca Uno television network in Mexico City, Mexico. Azteca Uno can be seen in most major cities in Mexico through TV Azteca's owned-and-operated transmitter network. XHDF provides HD programming to other transmitters and cable and satellite viewers. Azteca Uno also provides the United States Azteca America network with programming which sometimes can be seen simultaneously.

History

Initial years of operation

The concession for XHDF-TV was awarded in 1968 alongside that of XHTM-TV channel 8. The two stations were intended to come on in time for the 1968 Summer Olympics. While the first programs were broadcast on September 1 with the transmission of the fourth government report of President Gustavo Díaz Ordaz, full programs began with the opening of the Olympic Games on October 12. XHDF was owned by Organización Radio Centro through concessionaire Corporación Mexicana de Radio y Televisión, S.A. de C.V. The station had studios and a transmitter at the Torre Latinoamericana along with a second facility on Calle Mina in the historic center of Mexico City, but XHDF primarily broadcast filmed series with fewer resources than its Mexico City competitors.

Nationalization 

In 1972, due to debts owed to the state-owned Sociedad Mexicana de Crédito Industrial (Mexican Industrial Credit Society or SOMEX), XHDF and Corporación Mexicana de Radio y Televisión was nationalized.

The first director of the government-owned Canal 13 was Antonio Menéndez González, and after his death, he was succeeded by Enrique González Pedrero, senator of the state of Tabasco from the PRI. Corporación Mexicana de Radio y Televisión, along with another state-owned enterprise, Tele-Radio Nacional, began receiving new television concessions as part of a national expansion of the Mexico City station into a national television network.

One of the first orders of business for Canal 13 was a relocation. On July 14, 1976, Canal 13's new facilities in the Ajusco area of Mexico City were formally inaugurated by President Luis Echeverría. The event was attended by various figures from the political and business sectors of the country, including Secretary of the Interior Mario Moya Palencia and Secretary of Communications and Transportation Eugenio Méndez Docurro, as well as Emilio Azcárraga Milmo, Romulo O'Farrill and Miguel Alemán Velasco, who served as directors of Televisa.

In 1983, the Mexican government reorganized its broadcast holdings. The result was the creation of the Mexican Television Institute, which changed its name to Imevisión in 1985. Imevisión comprised not only Canal 13, now known as Red Nacional 13, but the former Televisión de la República Mexicana, with its channel 22 station, and a new network known as Red Nacional 7 and broadcast in Mexico City by the brand-new XHIMT-TV channel 7.

During the Imevisión years, Red Nacional 13 continued to broadcast commercial programming, although it featured some programs with a cultural focus, such as Temas de Garibay, Entre Amigos with Alejandro Aura, and several programs with the journalist Jorge Saldaña.

Privatization 

In 1993, the administration of Carlos Salinas de Gortari auctioned off Imevisión and some other government-owned media ventures in various packages. Radio Televisión del Centro, headed by electronics store owner Ricardo Salinas Pliego, bought all of the TV stations. The result was the creation of Televisión Azteca, which took its name from the holding company created for the largest of the packages: the Red Nacional 13, including XHDF.

Digital television

Digital subchannels 
The station's digital channel is multiplexed:

Repeaters
XHDF-TDT has eight direct repeaters:

|-

|-

|-

|-

|-

|-

|-

|}

Analog-to-digital conversion
XHDF was among the first stations in the country to obtain approval to build a digital television station, doing so in May 2005. The initial digital facility broadcast with just 37.6 kW, though its power was significantly raised ahead of the end of analog television. At midnight on December 17, 2015, XHDF analog on VHF channel 13 was shut off part of the IFT mandated transition from analog to digital television. In October 2016, the Azteca 13 network nationwide moved from virtual channel 13 to 1, with even the Mexico City station abandoning its longtime channel 13 designation. Ultimately, on January 1, 2018, the entire network was rebranded from Azteca Trece to Azteca Uno.

Programming

References

Azteca Uno transmitters
Television stations in Mexico City
Spanish-language television stations in Mexico
Television channels and stations established in 1968
1968 establishments in Mexico